Prague Cup is an international, multi-level synchronized skating competition, held in Prague, Czech Republic. Held since 2001 and being on a hiatus (no competitions in 2006 and 2011–2014), the competition has attracted the world's best-performing teams to compete. Prague Cup is organized by the Czech Figure Skating Association and sanctioned by the International Skating Union.

Medalists

Senior teams

References

External links
 Official website of Prague Cup

Synchronized skating competitions
Figure skating in the Czech Republic
Recurring sporting events established in 2001
Sport in Prague